In mathematics, a semitopological group is a topological space with a group action that is continuous with respect to each variable considered separately. It is a weakening of the concept of a topological group; all topological groups are semitopological groups but the converse does not hold.

Formal definition
A semitopological group  is a topological space that is also a group such that

Here  is viewed as a topological space with the product topology.)

Clearly, every topological group is a semitopological group. To see that the converse does not hold, consider the real line  with its usual structure as an additive abelian group.

It is known that any locally compact Hausdorff semitopological group is a topological group. Other similar results are also known.

See also
Lie group
Algebraic group
Compact group
Topological ring

References

Topological groups